Synchysite is a group of carbonate minerals. The three isostructural chemical end members are synchysite-(Ce), synchysite-(Nd) and synchysite-(Y). Huanghoite-(Ce) belongs to the group, but has a different symmetry and calcium is replaced by barium.

References

Carbonate minerals
Monoclinic minerals
Minerals in space group 15